Syntaphilin is a protein that in humans is encoded by the SNPH gene.

Function

Syntaxin-1, synaptobrevin/VAMP, and SNAP25 interact to form the SNARE complex, which is required for synaptic vesicle docking and fusion. The protein encoded by this gene is membrane-associated and inhibits SNARE complex formation by binding free syntaxin-1. Expression of this gene appears to be brain-specific. Alternative splicing results in multiple transcript variants encoding different isoforms.

References

Further reading